Mary Jean Stone (born at Brighton, Sussex, in 1853; died at Battle, Sussex, 3 May 1908) was an English historical writer.

Life
She was educated in Paris and at Aschaffenburg in Germany, where she acquired a knowledge of French, German, and Italian. In Germany she became a Roman Catholic convert, and was received into the Catholic Church by Monsignor Ketteler, then Bishop of Mainz.

On her return to England, she was encouraged as a historian by Jesuit contacts.

Works

"Faithful unto Death", a study of the martyrs of the Order of St. Francis during the Reformation period (1892);
"Eleanor Leslie", a memoir of a Scottish convert (1898);
"Mary the First, Queen of England" (1901);  
"Reformation and Renaissance" (1904), studies; 
"Studies from Court and Cloister", reprinted essays, including "Margaret Tudor", "Sir Henry Bedingfeld", and a "Missing Page from the Idylls of the King" (1905); 
"The Church in English History", a textbook for teachers of history (1907).

Her "Cardinal Pole", begun for the St. Nicholas Series, was interrupted by her death. She was a frequent contributor to the periodicals, the Dublin Review, The Month, Blackwood's Magazine, Cornhill Magazine, etc., and contributed several articles to Catholic Encyclopedia.

References

Attribution

1853 births
1908 deaths
English women non-fiction writers
English biographers
Women biographers
People from Brighton
19th-century women writers
People from Battle, East Sussex
19th-century English women
19th-century English people